is a quaternary stratovolcano and one of Japan's 100 famous mountains. The summit consists of Mount Shari,  and the western ridge. It is located on the Hokkaidō's Shiretoko Peninsula on the border of Shari and Kiyosato in Shari District, Abashiri and Shibetsu in Shibetsu District, Nemuro.

Naming 
Its former name in the Ainu language was Onnenupuri. The name Shari in Ainu means marshes where reeds are growing.

Geology 
The mountain is made mainly of andesite, dacite, and basalt.

Climbing routes 
The most popular ascent route starts from the Kiyosato side. A public bus (Sharibus) runs three times a day (first at 6:30) from Shiretokoshari Station to the start of the trail.

See also
List of mountains in Japan
List of volcanoes in Japan

References

External links 

 Shari Dake - Geological Survey of Japan
 

Mountains of Hokkaido
Stratovolcanoes of Japan
Volcanoes of Hokkaido
Pleistocene stratovolcanoes